Berwind may refer to:

Companies
Berwind Corporation, an American corporation historically involved in the coal industry

Law
Berwind-White Coal Mining Co. v. Chicago & Erie R. Co., a 1914 United States Supreme Court case

People
Edward Julius Berwind (1848–1936), an American businessman, founder of the Berwind-White Coal Mining Company
Julia Berwind (1870–1961), an American socialite and social welfare activist
Berwind P. Kaufmann (1897–1975), an American biologist

Places
Berwind, Colorado, a ghost town in Las Animas County, Colorado, in the United States
Berwind, West Virginia, a community in McDowell County, West Virginia, in the United States
Edward J. Berwind House, a mansion in New York City in the United States
Berwind Lake Wildlife Management Area, a wildlife management area in McDowell County, West Virginia, in the United States

Ships
SS Berwind, a commercial cargo ship sunk in 1918; see 
, a United States Navy patrol boat briefly in service during 1917